Major-General Sir William Douglas   (13 August 1858 – 1920) was a British Army officer.

Military career
Douglas was commissioned into the Royal Scots on 30 January 1878. He saw action in the Bechuanaland Expedition in 1884, and after attending Staff College in 1896, saw action again in the Second Boer War for which he was appointed a Companion of the Distinguished Service Order. He became a staff officer with Irish Command in March 1906.

He became commander of the 14th Infantry Brigade in November 1909 and General Officer Commanding East Lancashire Division in May 1913. He deployed with his division to Egypt in September 1914 and commanded it during the Gallipoli campaign for which he was appointed a Knight Commander of the Order of St Michael and St George. He went on to command the division in the Middle Eastern theatre before returning to England in March 1917. He then commanded the Western Reserve Centre before retiring in 1918.

Family 
Douglas married, in December 1885, Ellen Lytcott (a Lady of Grace of St John of Jerusalem), daughter of Samuel Taylor, Crown Solicitor, Barbados.

References

1858 births
1920 deaths
Knights Commander of the Order of St Michael and St George
Companions of the Order of the Bath
Companions of the Distinguished Service Order
British Army major generals
Royal Scots officers
Graduates of the Staff College, Camberley
British Army generals of World War I